Thomas Dalton may refer to:

 Thomas de Kirkcudbright (before 1294–1326), also known as Thomas de Dalton, medieval prelate from the Kingdom of Scotland
 Thomas Dalton (abolitionist) (1794–1883), African American abolitionist
 Thomas Dalton (Australian politician) (1829–1901), Irish-born Australian politician
 Tom Dalton (1904–1981), Australian politician and member of the New South Wales Legislative Assembly
 Thomas d'Alton (1895–1968), Australian politician
 Thomas Dalton (merchant) (1516/17–1591), English merchant, landowner, and Member of Parliament
 Thomas Dalton (MP for Leicester), MP for Leicester 1455-56
 Thomas Dalton (judge) (before 1702–1730), English judge and Chief Baron of the Irish Exchequer
 Thomas Dalton (holocaust denier), a US holocaust denying author.

References